Dark Mansions is a 1986 television film starring Joan Fontaine, Michael York, Linda Purl, Paul Shenar, Melissa Sue Anderson, Steve Inwood, Lois Chiles, Nicollette Sheridan, Raymond St. Jacques, Grant Aleksander, Yves André Martin, and Dan O'Herilhy.

Produced by Aaron Spelling and Douglas S. Cramer, Dark Mansions was shot as a pilot for a potential TV series cross between Dynasty and Dark Shadows. The project was not ordered to series, and aired as a television movie. It was directed by Jerry London and written by Anthony Lawrence, Nancy Lawrence and Robert McCullough.

Plot
Hired to interview and write a book about Margaret Drake, biographer Shellane Victor comes to the Drake estate, where family members notice her resemblance to their deceased relative, Yvette. The Drakes believe that Yvette, who died after falling off of a cliff, is haunting the mansion.

Cast and characters
 Joan Fontaine as Margaret Drake
 Michael York as Jason Drake
 Linda Purl as Shellane Victor
 Paul Shenar as Philip Drake
 Melissa Sue Anderson as Noelle Drake
 Lois Chiles as Jessica Drake
 Steve Inwood as Jerry Mills
 Nicollette Sheridan as Banda Drake
 Raymond St. Jacques as Davis
 Grant Aleksander as Nicholas Drake
 Yves André Martin as Cody Drake
 Dan O'Herlihy as Alexander Drake

References

External links

1986 television films
1986 films
ABC network original films
American television films
Films directed by Jerry London
1980s English-language films